Bareja is a town located about  from Ahmedabad, India. It is between Kheda and Ahmedabad. It has several schools, theatres and a GSRTC bus station. The AMTS bus service available in Bareja connects Lal Darvaja Station to Bareja Eye Hospital.

History
Gandhiji stopped in Bareja during the Salt March, which began in the nearby Ahmedabad suburb of Sabarmati Ashram. It was his second stop on the march, and he gave a short speech before continuing on towards Dandi.

References

Cities and towns in Ahmedabad district